Yii is an open source, object-oriented,  component-based MVC PHP web application framework. Yii is pronounced as "Yee" or [ji:] and in Chinese it means "simple and evolutionary" and it can be an acronym for "Yes It Is!".

History 
Yii started as an attempt to fix perceived drawbacks of the PRADO framework: Slow handling of complex pages, steep learning curve and difficulty to customize many controls. In October 2006, after ten months of development, the first alpha version of Yii was released, followed by the formal 1.00 release in December 2008.

Yii 1.1 was released in January 2010 adding a form builder, relational Active record queries, a unit testing framework and more. The Yii community continues to follow the 1.1 branch with PHP7+ support and security fixes. The latest version 1.1.23 was released in December 2020.

In May 2011 the developers decided to use new PHP versions and fix architectural shortcomings, resulting in version 2.0. In May 2013 the Yii 2.0 code went public, followed by the first stable release in October 2014. PHP8 is supported since version 2.0.38. The latest version 2.0.45 was released in February 2022.

Version history

Extensions 
The Yii project includes a repository of user-contributed extensions in addition to an official extension library, zii, which was merged with the core framework; it has been bundled in every release since Yii version 1.1.0 and includes additional widgets such as grids and jQuery UI.

See also 
 Active record pattern
 Comparison of web frameworks
 Model–view–controller
 Scaffold (programming)

References

Bibliography

Books

Journals

External links 
 

PHP software
Software using the BSD license
Web frameworks
PHP frameworks